Dominique Leclercq (born 30 November 1957) is a French former professional football player and manager. In his playing days, he was a goalkeeper.

Club career 
Leclercq is an academy graduate of Lens. He made his debut for the club's senior side in the 1976–77 season in the Division 1. After having made 27 league appearances for the club, he joined Nantes in 1980. At Nantes, Leclercq made 21 first-team appearances, while also playing for the club's reserve side across his spell at the club. He left in 1985 when he joined RC Paris.

At RC Paris, Leclercq won promotion from the Division 2 to the Division 1 in the 1985–86 season. He played nine games for the side in the Division 1 before signing for Lille in 1987. Two years later, Leclercq returned to Lens. Following a season at the club, he signed for his final team before retiring, Paris Saint-Germain (PSG). He made no appearances for PSG and retired in 1992.

International career 
Leclercq was a France youth international. He represented his nation at under-21 level.

Post-playing career 
Following his retirement in 1992, Leclercq became the manager of Paris Saint-Germain's reserve team. He stayed in this position for seven years, becoming the goalkeeping coach of the club's senior team in 1999. In February 2005, Leclercq's role within the coaching staff changed, and he became an assistant manager at the club. In December 2005, he left his role as PSG assistant coach to join neighboring club Paris FC as sporting director and youth coach.

In 2007, after two years at Paris  FC, Leclercq joined Amiens as reserve team manager. He only coached the side for a season before switching to the role of first-team goalkeeping coach. In 2012, Leclercq retired from coaching, leaving Amiens.

Honours 
RC Paris

 Division 2: 1985–86

References 

1957 births
Living people
People from Hazebrouck
Sportspeople from Nord (French department)
French footballers
Association football goalkeepers
France youth international footballers
France under-21 international footballers
RC Lens players
FC Nantes players
Racing Club de France Football players
Lille OSC players
Paris Saint-Germain F.C. players
French Division 3 (1971–1993) players
Ligue 1 players
Ligue 2 players
French football managers
Association football goalkeeping coaches
Association football coaches
Paris Saint-Germain F.C. non-playing staff
Paris FC non-playing staff
Amiens SC non-playing staff
Footballers from Hauts-de-France